Hawaii Tribune-Herald is a daily newspaper based in Hilo, Hawaii. It is owned and published by Oahu Publications Inc., a subsidiary of Black Press.

History
The Hilo Tribune began publication on November 23, 1895, and changed its name to the Hilo Daily Tribune in 1917. The Hilo Daily Tribune, the Hawaii Herald (August 13, 1896 – February 22, 1923) and the Daily Post-Herald merged to form the Hilo Tribune-Herald, which began publishing on February 19, 1923.  It continued under that name until March 1964, when it assumed its present title.

In 1962, the newspaper began publication of a weekly special edition for the west (Kona) side of the island, which later became West Hawaii Today, now published daily.

2007 average net circulation was 18,715 (daily), 21,638 (Sunday).

With the demise of the Hawaii Island Journal in June 2008, Tribune-Herald owner Stephens Media Group ran all the commercial newspapers on the island including the Big Island Weekly. Big Island Weekly published its last issue in July 2014.

On October 1, 2014, Oahu Publications, the publisher of the Honolulu Star-Advertiser announced it was buying the Hawaii Tribune-Herald and West Hawaii Today from Stephens Media.

Subsidiary publications 
 West Hawaii Today, Kailua-Kona, Hawaii (daily)

External links
Hawaii Tribune-Herald official web site
Issues of the Hilo Tribune (from January 2, 1902 to June 26, 1906), a predecessor of the Hawaii Tribune-Herald, on Chronicling America

References

Newspapers published in Hawaii
Hawaii (island)
Publications established in 1895
1895 establishments in Hawaii
Black Press newspapers